Nachtjagdgeschwader 4 (NJG 4) was a Luftwaffe night fighter-wing of World War II. NJG 4 was formed on 18 April 1941 in Metz. The unit's objective was to counter RAF Bomber Command's strategic night-bombing offensive. The unit's commanding officers included Oberstleutnant Wolfgang Thimmig (October 1943 – November 1944) and Major Heinz-Wolfgang Schnaufer (20 November 1944 – 8 May 1945).

Commanding officers

Geschwaderkommodore
Major Rudolf Stoltenhoff, 18 April 1941 – 20 October 1943
Oberstleutnant Wolfgang Thimmig, 20 October 1943 – 14 November 1944
Major Heinz-Wolfgang Schnaufer, 14 November 1944 – 8 May 1945

Gruppenkommandeur

I. Gruppe
Major Wilhelm Herget, 1 September 1942 – December 1944
Hauptmann Johannes Krause, December 1944 – 8 May 1945

II. Gruppe
Hauptmann Theodor Rossiwall, 1 October 1942 – 13 January 1943

References

Citations

Bibliography

 
 

Nachtjagdgeschwader 004
Military units and formations established in 1941
Military units and formations disestablished in 1945